Herman Kauz (born 1928 in New York City) is a prominent author and teacher of the martial arts, in particular T'ai chi ch'uan. He died January 30, 2020.

Life
He is a graduate of the University of Hawaii, studied at the University of Chicago, and holds a master's degree from Columbia University.

He has studied and trained in Aikido, Judo, Karate, Wrestling, and T'ai chi ch'uan.

Works

The Tai Chi Handbook, Random House, 

The Martial Spirit, The Overlook Press, 

A Path to Liberation: A Spiritual and Philosophical Approach to the Martial Arts,  The Overlook Press, 

Push Hands: Handbook for Non-Competitive Tai Chi Practice with a Partner, The Overlook Press, 

The Tai Chi Handbook was re-issued by The Overlook Press, 26 May 2009,

References

External links
Herman Kauz Profile – Lucky Person Tai Chi Club Site
Reaction Without Thought: An Interview with Herman Kauz, Tai Chi Master

American tai chi practitioners
Living people
1928 births